The Robert Fulton School is a historic school building at 1000-1012 Carlisle Avenue in the Fulton Hill neighborhood of Richmond, Virginia.  It is a two-story T-shaped structure, built with a frame of concrete and steel and finished in brick.  It was built in 1916 to a design by William Leigh Carneal, a prominent Virginia architect, as part of a school construction program instituted by longtime superintendent J.A.C. Chandler.  It served as a school until 1979, at first as a segregated white school, and then as a school for African-Americans as the Fulton Hill area became increasingly black.  It was integrated in 1969.

The school was listed on the National Register of Historic Places in 2017.  It has been converted into residences.

See also
National Register of Historic Places listings in Richmond, Virginia

References

National Register of Historic Places in Richmond, Virginia
Colonial Revival architecture in Virginia
School buildings completed in 1917
Schools in Richmond, Virginia
School buildings on the National Register of Historic Places in Virginia
1917 establishments in Virginia